Phoenician joints is a locked mortise and tenon wood joinery technique used in shipbuilding to fasten watercraft hulls. The locked (or pegged) mortise and tenon technique consists of cutting a mortise, or socket, into the edges of two planks and fastening them together with a rectangular wooden knob. The assembly is then locked in place by driving a dowel through one or more holes drilled through the mortise side wall and tenon.

The Phoenicians pioneered the use of locked mortise and tenon joints in nautical joinery to secure the underwater planking of seagoing ships. The use of pegged mortises and tenons in shipbuilding spread westward from the Levantine littoral.

By the first millennium BC, Phoenician joints became a common edge-to-edge fastening method. Ancient Greek and Roman shipbuilders adopted the technique of Phoenician joinery. The ancient Greek historian Polybius reported that the Romans copied the locked mortise and tenon technique from a Punic warship that ran aground in 264 BC. They exploited this technique to their advantage early in the First Punic War in 260 BC which allowed them to build a fleet of 100 quinqueremes within a period of two months.

History 
Phoenician joints postdate the sewn watercraft lacing joinery technique. Archaeological finds have revealed transitional watercrafts integrating elements from both mortise and tenon, and other joinery techniques.

Chinese Neolithic societies used the locked mortise and tenon method, but did not use a separate rectangular tenon nor edge-to-edge plank joining.

In the third and early second millennium BC, the Ancient Egyptians employed a similar technique, however, the mortise and tenon joints were not locked in place using pegs. To ensure ship hull stability, the Egyptians used their unlocked fastening technique together with other methods of wood fastening. The barque's cedar planks were joined together using unlocked mortise and tenon, and two types of lashings between bordering strakes and, from sheer to sheer. The mixed use of unlocked mortise and tenon with wood lashing is also attested in later ancient Egyptian ships from Lisht and Dashur. The use of pegged mortise and tenon shipbuilding in Egypt is not supported by material evidence before around 500 BC.

The Phoenicians pioneered the use of locked mortise and tenon joints in nautical joinery to secure the underwater planking of seagoing ships. The use of pegged mortises and tenons in shipbuilding spread westward from the Levantine littoral. According to McGrail, this joinery method could have given rise to the Phoenicians' reputation for seafaring excellence. The hull of the Uluburun ship, an early Phoenician/Canaanite vessel dated , is the earliest evidence of pegged Phoenician joints used in Mediterranean shipbuilding. The ship's hull was built with Lebanese cedar, with oak tenons. Additional early evidence of Phoenician joint usage comes from another Canaanite shipwreck in Cape Gelidonya in Turkey dated . The Uluburun and Gelidonya ships allowed scholars to date back the Phoenicians' maritime activity to an earlier period when it was thought that Canaanite seafaring did not start before the first millennium BC, and that maritime trade in the Eastern Mediterranean was solely conducted by Mycenaeans.

By the first millennium BC, Phoenician joints became a common edge-to-edge fastening method in the ancient Mediterranean. Greek shipbuilders abruptly abandoned the laced wood technique and adopted the Phoenician joinery. Scholars posit that Greek shipbuilders acquired the mortise and tenon joinery technique from the Phoenicians. Phoenician influence on Greek shipbuilding technology resulted from contact between the two people during the Phoenicians' westward colonization.

By the middle of the first millennium BC shipbuilders developed deeper understanding and expertise in the locked mortise and tenon joints as evidenced in the fourth century BC Kyrenia shipwreck and the third century BC wreckage of the Marsala Punic warship.

In 264 BC, the Romans seized a Phoenician penteres that ran aground. Polybius reports that the ship served as a model for the Romans' fleet ships; they realized the advantage of using Phoenician joints in shipbuilding, as the lumber used in edge-joined ship strakes does not have to be dried. Early in the First Punic War in 260 BC, the Phoenician joint technique allowed the Romans to build a fleet of 100 quinqueremes within a period of two months.

The technique is also seen in Vietnam. Excavation carried out in waterlogged burials in Dong Xa in Vietnam revealed the adoption of a variety of the locked mortise and tenon technique in the construction of a logboat. The boat dates back to the Dong Son culture in the late Vietnamese prehistory (500 BC to AD 200).

Description 
The locked (or pegged) mortise and tenon technique consists of cutting a mortise, or socket, into the faces of two planks to be fastened together. A piece of wood called a tenon, usually taking the form of a rectangle, is inserted into each mortise to join the two planks together. The assembly is locked by driving a peg (or dowel pin or treenail) through one or more holes drilled through mortise side wall and tenon. This technique is known as Phoenician joint when applied to shipbuilding.

Etymology 
The Latin term is known through the extant writings such as that of Cato the Elder.

These terms derived from the Ancient Greek word , plural form , an exonym used indiscriminately to refer to both western and eastern Phoenicians.

 translates to the English "coagment" meaning to join together or unite.

See also 
 Lashed-lug boat
 Phoenician expedition
 Phoenician Ship Expedition
 Sewn boat
 Ship Sarcophagus

Notes

References

Citations

Sources
 

 

 

 

 

 

 

 
 

 

Joinery
Watercraft components
Shipbuilding
Science and technology in Phoenicia
Ancient technology